Jaanikese is a village in Valga Parish, Valga County in southern Estonia. Jaanikese also borders Latvia in the west, and is situated between Valga–Uulu (road to Viljandi and Pärnu) and Valga–Tartu (road to Tartu, part of E264) roads.

Jaanikese is known for its motocross circuit where many international competitions have taken place.

Valga Airfield, former Soviet military airfield was located in Jaanikese.

References

Valga Parish
Villages in Valga County